Aliette Opheim (née Aliette Johansson; born 21 July 1985) is a Swedish actress.

In 2015, Stockholm's Rising Star Award went to Opheim, for her performance in Lisa Aschan's White People.

Selected filmography
Sandor slash Ida (2005)
Thicker Than Water (2014)
100 Code (2015)
Patriot (2015-2018)
Caliphate (2020), Swedish SÄPO police anti-terrorism analyst Fatima
Katla (2021)

References

External links
 Aliette Opheim - IMDb
 actorsinscandinavia.com: Aliette Opheim
 

1985 births
Living people
Swedish film actresses
Swedish television actresses
21st-century Swedish actresses
People from Linköping Municipality